Vidyaranyapuram is a suburb of Mysore City in the Karnataka state of India.

Location
Vidyaranyapuram is located on the southern side of Mysore City on the road to Jayaprakash Nagar Mysore.

Landmarks
 Vishweshwarara Nagar
 Gundu Rao Nagar
 Sterling Theatre Junction
 Sewage Farm Junction
 Maharshi group of institutions

Image gallery

See also
 Jayaprakash Nagar Mysore
 Ashokapuram, Mysore
 Nanju Mallige
 Mananthavady Road

References

Mysore South
Suburbs of Mysore